Mithraeum in Hawarte – a sanctuary of the Persian god Mithra, discovered under the basilica of Archbishop Photios in Hawarte, Syria, near Apamea.

Archaeological research 
In the 1970s, archaeological work at the site of Hawarte was conducted by Maria Teresa and Pierre Canivet. They focused, among others, on the three-nave basilica of Archbishop Photios built in AD 480. The mithraeum was discovered about 20 years later when the mosaic floor in the middle of the nave collapsed. In 1998, the Syrian Directorate-General for Antiquities and Museums invited Prof. Michał Gawlikowski and his team from the Polish Centre of Mediterranean Archaeology University of Warsaw to study the mithraeum and protect the remains of wall paintings adorning the walls and ceiling of the cave. The room itself had been robbed earlier, and only fragments of decoration were preserved. Their state deteriorated further due to the atmospheric conditions to which they had been exposed since the discovery of the cave. During the excavations, which lasted until 2005, all fragments of the wall paintings were protected in situ. After that, the conservation work started. Fragments of painted plaster brought from other collections to the museum in Hama were protected in 2005 and 2006. In 2010, the project aiming to reconstruct the iconographic program of the mithraeum’s painted decoration was commenced by Dr. Dobrochna Zielińska.

Wall paintings 
Painted decoration in mithraea is rare and usually limited to the borders of the niche. Only a few examples are known, including one from Dura Europos. The wall paintings in the mithraeum in Hawarte are thus exceptional. They depict symbolic scenes from the myth about Mithra, and so are an important source for the studies on Mithraism.

See also 

 Mithraism
 Mithraeum

References 

 Michał Gawlikowski, Excavations in Hawarte 2008–2009. Polish Archaeology in the Mediterranean, 21 (2012)
 Dobrochna Zielińska, Hawarte. Project for the reconstruction of the painted decoration of the mithreum. Polish Archaeology in the Mediterranean, 19 (2010)
 Ewa Parandowska, Hawarte, mithraic wall paintings conservation project. Seasons 2005–2006. Polish Archaeology in the Mediterranean, 18 (2008)
 Michał Gawlikowski, The mithraeum at Hawarte and its paintings. Journal of Roman Archaeology, 20 (2007)
 Michał Gawlikowski, Le mithreum de Haouarte (Apamène). Topoi, 11/1 (2001)
 Michał Gawlikowski, Hawarte. Excavations, 1999. Polish Archaeology in the Mediterranean, 11 (2000)

External links 

 Hawarte - the joint Syro-Polish expedition to Hawarte

Footnotes 

Mithraea
Archaeological sites in Syria